The Navy Meritorious Civilian Service Award is awarded to civilian employees in the Department of the Navy  for meritorious service or contributions resulting in high value or benefits for the Navy or the Marine Corps.  It is conferred for a contribution that applies to a local or smaller area of operation or a project of lesser importance than would be warranted for consideration for the Navy Distinguished Civilian Service Award or the Navy Superior Civilian Service Award. It is awarded by the local activity head to U.S. Navy employees for service or contributions resulting in high value or benefit to the Department of Navy. The award consists of a certificate and citation signed by the activity head, medal and lapel emblem. The award is the third highest Navy civilian award, ranking just behind the Navy Superior Civilian Service Award, which is itself behind the Navy Distinguished Civilian Service Award.

Eligibility 
Accomplished supervisory or non-supervisory duties in an exemplary manner, setting a record of achievement, and inspiring others to improve the quantity and quality of their work. Exhibited unusual courage or competence in an emergency, while performing assigned duties, resulting in direct benefit to the Government or its personnel. Rendered professional or public relations service of a unique or distinctive character. Demonstrated unusual initiative and skill in devising new and improved equipment, work methods, and procedures; inventions resulting in substantial savings in expenses such as manpower, time, space, and materials, or improved safety or health of the workforce; improving morale of employees in a unit which resulted in improvement of work performance and esprit de corps. This award may also be given at the time of retirement.

Award recipients

Neal V Fisher II, Chief of Naval Personnel, 2023
Marlo Brooks, 2023
William Anderson, Office of the Judge Advocate General, 2022
John Visneuski, 2022
Greg Hansford, 2022
Francisco Borja, 2022
Walt Sidorovich, Naval Air Warfare Center Aircraft Division, 2022
Stephen (Rusty) Weathers, Naval Surface Warfare Center Panama City Division, 2022
John DiMaio, Naval Undersea Warfare Center Division Newport, 2022 
Gary Huntress, Naval Undersea Warfare Center Division Newport, 2022 
Darrin Krivitsky, Naval Surface Warfare Center Indian Head Division, 2022
John Hurley, Naval Surface Warfare Center Indian Head Division, 2022
Michael Gatti, 2022
Elizabeth B. Wrightson, United States Naval Academy, 2022
Charles W. Phelps, 2018, 2019, 2022
Justin Dobson, RDSA 2022
Rita Dolan, 2022
Shane M. Hillhouse, 2022
David Lin, 2022
Robert M. Shepherd III, NAVSUP WSS, 4/2022
Mr. Antonio Genovesi, Aviation Supply Depot Sigonella, 2022
Regina Padgett, 2022
Mr. Charles G Manson, Jul 2021
Mr. Nikita G. Vanderwall, 2021
Dr. Kimberly Marie Cipolla, 2021
Josh Negron, 2021
Garrett Haley, 2020
Amanda K. Morgan, 2020
Timothy P. Trant, Chief of Naval Personnel, 2019
Toufue Chang, Naval Air Warfare Center Weapons Division, 2019
Judith Harrison, 2000, 2018
Kelly Curran, 2018
Richard Ramey, 2017
Lawrence A. McGowan, NAVSEA 07, Undersea Warfare Directorate, Washington, D.C., 2014 (USN)
Gary Parker, NAVSUP, 2014
Mr. Robert Bruninga, United States Naval Academy, 2014
Louis William Nelson, 2013
Jessica Evins (née Kirsch), Naval Sea Systems Command, 2012
Gary Parker, NMIMC, 2004
Lyn Michel Macdonald (McNeese), Subase Nlon 2000
Ms. Carolyn Merlo, Naval Weapons Station, Seal Beach, CA  27 Jul 1999
Mr. Glenn M. Parrish, Commander, Naval Air Force Pacific, 1999
William Burrow U.S. Naval Antarctic Support Unit, Christchurch NZ, 20 February 1998
Joseph Rogers, U.S Naval Postgraduate School, Monterey Ca. September 25, 2003
Michael Brininstool, U.S. Naval Command, Control and Ocean Surveillance Center (NRaD) June 03, 1994
Marilyn Wicker, SCMC, Marine Corps Logistics Command, MCLB Albany GA, 2022
Harry Melching, SCMC, Marine Corps Logistics Command, MCLB Albany GA, 2022
Eileen K. Carnaggio, USMC, Marine Corps Base Hawaii, Kaneohe, HI, 2019
 Christine Lamer, Naval Information Warfare Systems Command, 2021
 Robert H. Farrow, DoD, Marine Corps Base Hawaii, Kaneohe HI. 2007

See also 
 Meritorious Civilian Service Award

References

Awards and decorations of the United States Department of Defense
Awards and decorations of the United States Navy